Georgian Sign Language is the national sign language of the deaf in the country of Georgia.

Fingerspelling originally used an alphabet based on the Russian manual alphabet.  However, in 2012 a new Mkhedruli-based manual alphabet was developed with the support of the Union of the Deaf of Georgia.

References

Sign languages
Languages of Georgia (country)